The first elections to the Montgomeryshire County Council were held in January 1889. 22 Liberals and 18 Conservatives were elected.

Results

Cemmaes

Darowen

Llanbrynmair

Llanidloes Borough

Llanidloes Parish

Machynlleth

Newtown

Uwchygarreg

Welshpool

References

Bibliography
 

1889
1889 Welsh local elections